The Reckless Hour is a 1931 pre-Code film directed by John Francis Dillon and produced and distributed by First National Pictures.

Cast
Dorothy Mackaill as Margaret Nichols
Conrad Nagel as Edward Adams
H. B. Warner as Walter Nichols
Joan Blondell as Myrtle Nichols
Walter Byron as Allen Crane
Joe Donahue as Harry Gleason
Dorothy Peterson as Miss Susie Jennison
Helen Ware as Harriett Nichols
Billy House as Seymour Jennison
Claude King as Howard Crane
Ivan F. Simpson as Stevens, Adam's butler

Preservation status
The film is preserved at the  Library of Congress.

Home media
It was released on Warner Archive DVD with another Mackaill film, Bright Lights.

References

External links

The Reckless Hour at IMDb.com
allmovie/synopsis; dvd; The Reckless Hour

1931 films
1931 drama films
American drama films
American black-and-white films
Films directed by John Francis Dillon
Films set in New York City
First National Pictures films
Films with screenplays by Florence Ryerson
Warner Bros. films
1930s English-language films
1930s American films